Carlos Pérez Salvachúa (born 30 April 1973) is a Spanish football manager, currently in charge of CD Tudelano.

Managerial career 
A UEFA Pro Licence holder, Salvachúa began his career with Real Madrid C.F. at La Fábrica, in which he spent 6 seasons. Salvachua was an integral part of the coaching staff, overseeing the development of several high-profile players during his coaching tenure. Working in both senior head coach and assistant roles, he won four league championships and achieved promotion twice during his time in Europe.

After spending time managing Segunda División B club UB Conquense, as well as serving as a scout for Villarreal CF youth, Salvachúa joined CD Guadalajara in 2007, where he would remain until June 2015, serving assistant coach and manager roles during his time with the club. Salvachúa guided Guadalajara to the final of the 2013–14 Copa Federación de España and to the promotional playoffs in the 2014–15 season.

At the conclusion of his time at Guadalajara, Salvachúa returned to Villarreal as manager of Villarreal CF C, replacing Javier Torres Gómez. In July 2017, after two seasons with Villarreal CF C, he was appointed manager of Real Valladolid Promesas for the 2017–18 season. In September 2017, he resigned from his position.

In July 2018, Salvachúa joined Melbourne Victory FC as an assistant coach to Kevin Muscat. After Muscat's departure in 2019, he remained with the club under Marco Kurz. After Kurz was dismissed in January 2020, Salvachúa was appointed caretaker manager until the conclusion of the season. However, on 30 May 2020, with 5 regular season A-League matches remaining in Melbourne Victory's season, Salvachúa departed the club to return to Europe to be closer to his family.

In June 2020, Salvachúa joined Belgian First Division A club Sint-Truidense V.V. as an assistant coach.

In April 2021, Salvachúa became the manager of Las Rozas CF.

On October 14, 2021, Salvachúa became the manager of CD Tudelano of the Primera División RFEF, after the dismissal of Javier Olaizola.

Managerial statistics

References

External links

1973 births
Living people
Sportspeople from Madrid
Spanish football managers
Primera Federación managers
Segunda División B managers
Tercera División managers
UB Conquense managers
CD Guadalajara (Spain) managers
A-League Men managers
Melbourne Victory FC managers
Real Madrid CF non-playing staff
Villarreal CF non-playing staff
Spanish expatriate sportspeople in Australia
Expatriate soccer managers in Australia
Spanish expatriate football managers
Association football scouts
Association football coaches